Punk Goes 80's is the fourth in album in the Punk Goes... series created by Fearless Records. It contains covers of songs that were popular in the 1980s covered by various alternative rock, and pop punk bands. This is also the first album to feature the song "Your Love" by The Outfield being covered by the band Midtown. The song would later appear again on the compilation Punk Goes Classic Rock being covered then by electronicore band I See Stars.

Track listing

References

Covers albums
Punk Goes series
2005 compilation albums